Philip Dunne or Dunn may refer to:
Philip Dunne (Stalybridge and Hyde MP) (1904–1965), Unionist MP 1935–1937
Philip Dunne (writer) (1908–1992), Hollywood screenwriter and director
Philip Dunne (Ludlow MP) (born 1958), British Conservative Party politician, Member of Parliament since 2005
Philip Dunn (racewalker) (born 1971), American race walker
Sir Philip Dunn, 2nd Baronet (1905–1976), of the Dunn baronets